Blimus are a five-piece band hailing from Weybourne, Surrey who formed in 2003 and play psychedelic country rock. They were described as "very, very strange indeed" by the Guilfest 2006 programme.

References

British country rock musical groups